Crambus attis is a moth in the family Crambidae. It was described by Graziano Bassi in 2012. It is found in South Africa and Eswatini.

References

Crambini
Moths described in 2012
Moths of Africa